Heavy cake or Hevva cake is a cake made from flour, lard, butter, milk, sugar and raisins that originated in Cornwall.

Its name is derived from the pilchard industry in Cornwall prior to the 20th century when a 'huer' (cliff top lookout) helped locate shoals of fish. The huer would shout 'Hevva!, Hevva!' to alert the boats to the location of the pilchard shoals. Cornish tradition states that Hevva cake was baked by the huers on their return to their homes, the cake being ready by the time the crews returned to land.  Alternatively, it is known as heavy cake as it is not "light", not risen in the same way as yeast cake or a seedy bun.

The cakes are about 1/2" thick, with a criss-cross pattern scored across the top, representing the fishing nets.

References

See also

 Welsh cake
 List of cakes

Cornish cuisine
British cakes